The American-British-Dutch-Australian (ABDA) Command, or ABDACOM, was the short-lived supreme command for all Allied forces in South East Asia in early 1942, during the Pacific War in World War II. The command consisted of the forces of Australia, the Netherlands, United Kingdom and the United States. The main objective of the command, led by General Sir Archibald Wavell, was to maintain control of the "Malay Barrier" (or "East Indies Barrier"), a notional line running down the Malay Peninsula, through Singapore and the southernmost islands of the Dutch East Indies. ABDACOM was also known in British military circles as the "South West Pacific Command", although it should not be confused with the later South West Pacific Area command (see below).

Although ABDACOM was only in existence for a few weeks and presided over one defeat after another, it did provide some useful lessons for combined Allied commands later in the war.

Formation
Efforts to organise the ABDA Command began soon after war between the Allies and Japan commenced, on 7 December 1941. Army Chief of Staff George C. Marshall and Secretary of War Henry L. Stimson were anxious to establish unity of command over the Allied forces in all theatres after observing Allied defeats in the Battle of France, the Mediterranean and Middle East theatre, and the attack on Pearl Harbor. 

Despite objections from the British military establishment, the scheme was finalized at the Arcadia Conference in Washington. On December 27 Marshall and Admiral Ernest King proposed an ABDA Command led by Archibald Wavell to Charles Portal, Dudley Pound, and John Dill. The British were skeptical and believed the Pacific theatre was too geographically large to be controlled by a single commander. Winston Churchill warned Marshall about the difficulties faced by Ferdinand Foch as Supreme Allied Commander while simply trying to coordinate operations across the Western Front of World War I. Marshall rebuffed this and other historical analogies from Churchill, telling him that he "was not interested in Drake and Frobisher, but I was interested in having a united front against Japan." Churchill reluctantly telephoned his War Cabinet in London advising them to accept the arrangement despite their concerns. On December 29, Winston Churchill said that it had been agreed Wavell would be supreme commander in order to assuage British concerns. Wavell then held the position of British Commander-in-Chief, India. Churchill added:

It is intended that General Wavell should have a staff in the south Pacific accessible as Foch's High Control Staff was to the Great Staffs of the British and French armies in France [during World War I]. He would receive his orders from an appropriate joint body who will be responsible to me as the Minister of Defence and to the President of the United States who is also Commander-in-Chief of all United States forces.

Following the declaration by the four nations on 1 January 1942, the Allied governments formally appointed Wavell. The formation of ABDACOM meant that Wavell had control of a huge, but thinly spread force, covering an area from Burma in the west, to Dutch New Guinea and the Commonwealth of the Philippines in the east. Other areas, including the British Raj and the Territory of Hawaii, remained officially under separate commands, and in practice General Douglas MacArthur was in complete control of Allied forces in the Philippines. At Wavell's insistence, North West Australia (see map) was added to the ABDA area. The rest of Australia was under Australian control, as were its territories of Papua and New Guinea.

ABDA was charged with holding the Malay Barrier for as long as possible in order to retain Allied control of the Indian Ocean and the western sea approaches to Australia. This was a nearly hopeless task, given the Japanese supremacy in naval forces in the western Pacific. The task was further complicated by the addition of Burma to the command; the difficulties of coordinating action between forces of four nationalities that used different equipment and had not trained together; and the different priorities of the national governments. British leaders were primarily interested in retaining control of Singapore; the military capacity of the Dutch East Indies had suffered as a result of the defeat of the Netherlands by Nazi Germany in 1940, and the Dutch administration was focused on defending the island of Java; the Australian government was heavily committed to the war in North Africa and Europe, and had few readily accessible military resources; and the United States was preoccupied with the Philippines, which at the time was a U.S. Commonwealth territory.

Wavell arrived in Singapore, where the British Far East Command was based, on 7 January 1942. ABDACOM absorbed this British command in its entirety. On 18 January, Wavell moved his headquarters to Lembang near Bandoeng on Java. On 1 February the air force portion of ABDA moved its headquarters from Lembang to Bandoeng when it became clear that the former place lacked sufficient accommodation. This made cooperation between air and naval forces difficult.

The first notable success for forces under ABDACOM was the U.S. Navy's attack at Balikpapan, Borneo on January 24, which cost the Japanese six transport ships, but had little effect on them capturing the prized oil wells of Borneo.

The governments of Australia, the Netherlands and New Zealand lobbied Winston Churchill for an Allied inter-governmental war council, with overall responsibility for the Allied war effort in Asia and the Pacific, based in Washington, D.C. A Far Eastern Council (later known as the Pacific War Council) was established in London on February 9, with a corresponding staff council in Washington. However, the smaller powers continued to push for a body based in the United States.

Collapse and dissolution
In the meantime, the rapid collapse of Allied resistance to Japanese attacks in Malaya, Singapore, the Dutch East Indies, the Philippines and other countries had soon overwhelmed the Malay Barrier. The fall of Singapore on 15 February dislocated the ABDA command, which was dissolved a week later.

Wavell resigned as supreme commander on 25 February 1942, handing control of the ABDA Area to local commanders. He also recommended the establishment of two Allied commands to replace ABDACOM: a south west Pacific command, and one based in India. In anticipation of this, Wavell had handed control of Burma to the British Indian Army and reassumed his previous position, as Commander-in-Chief India.

Following the destruction of the ABDA strike force under Rear-Admiral Karel Doorman, at the Battle of the Java Sea, in February–March 1942, ABDA effectively ceased to exist.

As the Imperial Japanese Army closed in on the remaining Allied forces in the Philippines, MacArthur was ordered to relocate to Australia. On 17 March, the U.S. government appointed him as Supreme Allied Commander South West Pacific Area, a command which included Australia and New Guinea in addition to Japanese-held areas. The rest of the geographic area of the Pacific Theater of Operations remained under the Pacific Ocean Areas command, led by Commander-in-Chief Admiral Chester Nimitz of the U.S. Navy.

The inter-governmental Pacific War Council was established in Washington on 1 April, but remained largely ineffectual due to the overwhelming predominance of U.S. forces in the Pacific theater throughout the war.

Perhaps the most notable success for ABDA forces was the guerilla campaign in Timor, waged by Australian and Dutch infantry for almost 12 months after Japanese landings there on February 19.

Official command structure

General Sir Archibald Wavell, British Army (BA) – Supreme Commander
 Lieutenant General George H. Brett, U.S. Army Air Forces (USAAF) – Deputy Commander
 Lt Gen. Henry Pownall (BA) – Chief of Staff

Land forces (ABDARM)
 Lt Gen. Hein ter Poorten, Royal Netherlands East Indies Army (KNIL) – commander of land forces (ABDA Land); also in direct command of Dutch East Indies land forces
 Major General Ian Playfair (BA) – deputy land commander in chief of staff, land forces
 Maj. Gen. T. J. Hutton (BA) – British forces in Burma
 Maj. Gen. David Blake, Australian Army, Australian 7th Military District (Northern Australia)
 Lt Gen. Arthur Percival (BA) – Malaya Command
 Gen. Douglas MacArthur, United States Army – Allied forces in the Philippines
(MacArthur was technically subordinate to Wavell, but in reality many of the chains of command shown here operated independently of ABDACOM and/or existed only on paper.)

Air forces (ABDAIR)
 Air Marshal Sir Richard Peirse, Royal Air Force (RAF), commander of air forces (ABDA Air)
 Maj. Gen. Lewis H. Brereton (USAAF), deputy commander air forces
 Air Vice-Marshal Sir Paul Copeland Maltby RAF, Air Officer Commanding RAF in Java
 Air Vice-Marshal D. F. Stevenson RAF, NORGROUP (RAF: Burma)
 Air V. Marshal C. W. Pulford RAF, WESGROUP (RAF: Malaya and North Sumatra)
 ? CENGROUP (KNIL: South Sumatra and West Java; merged with EASGROUP on 22 February 1942)
 ? EASGROUP (USAAF: East Java; merged with CENGROUP on 22 February 1942)
 Maj. Gen. Ludolph van Oyen (sometimes van Oijen) Royal Netherlands East Indies Army Air Force (KNIL), Allied Air Forces Java after February 22.
 RECGROUP (air reconnaissance group) Kapitein ter Zee G. G. Bozuwa Royal Netherlands Navy
 (deputy) Captain Frank D. Wagner, USN  (flying boat reconnaissance units: Marineluchtvaartdienst (MLD); Patrol Wing 10, US Navy; No. 205 Squadron RAF) 
 Air Commodore D. E. L. Wilson, Royal Australian Air Force, AUSGROUP (RAAF: North-Western Australia, Molucca Sea & Dutch New Guinea)

Naval forces (ABDAFLOAT)
 Admiral Thomas C. Hart, U.S. Navy (USN) commander of naval forces (ABDA Sea). Until 12 February 1942.
 Adm. Conrad Helfrich, Royal Netherlands Navy (RNN) After 12 February 1942.
 Rear Admiral Arthur Palliser, (British) Royal Navy, deputy commander naval forces
 R. Adm. William A. Glassford, Jr. (USN) commander U.S. naval forces
 R. Adm. Johan van Staveren (RNN) commander Dutch naval forces
 Commodore John Collins, Royal Australian Navy, commander British-Australian naval forces

Allied ships that served under the command

American 
  - lost
  - heavily damaged
 
 
 
 
 
 
  - lost
 
  - lost
  - lost
  - lost
  - lost
 
 
  - lost
 
 
  - lost
 USS Otus (AS-20)
  - lost
 USS Childs (AVD-1)
 USS Heron (AVP-2)
 Lanikai (converted yacht)
  - lost

British 
  - lost
  - lost
  - lost
 
 
 
 
  - lost
  - lost
 
 
  - lost
 HMS Scout
  - lost
  - lost
  - lost

Dutch 
  - lost
 
  - lost
  - lost
  - lost
  - lost
  - lost
  - lost
 
  - lost
  - lost

Australian 
  - lost
 
 
  (ex. HMS Vampire) - lost

See also
 South East Asia Command
 South-East Asian Theatre

Citations

General references 
 Morison, S. E. History of United States Naval Operations in World War II.  Volume III: The Rising Sun in the Pacific.  Little, Brown, and Company, 1948.
 Willmot, H. P. Empires in the Balance: Japanese and Allied Pacific Strategies to April 1942.  Annapolis: Naval Institute Press, 1982.

External links
 Boundaries of ABDA Area
 British War office report on: OPERATIONS IN BURMA FROM 15th DECEMBER 1941 to 20th MAY 1942
 Parliamentary Debates, House of Commons Official Report, Jan. 27, 1942. on the Far Eastern theatre and A.B.D.A
 February 15 1942: The fall of Singapore Capitulation telegram from ABDACOM to Prime Minister of Australia
 account of the ABDA campaign
 Chapter 10: Loss of the Netherlands East Indies

1942 in British Malaya
Allied commands of World War II
Military history of Malaya during World War II
Military history of the Netherlands during World War II
Military of Singapore under British rule
Military units and formations established in 1942
Dutch-Australian culture